This list presents notable scientific journals in earth and atmospheric sciences and its various subfields.

Multi-disciplinary

Atmospheric science

Geochemistry 
 Chemical Geology
 Geochimica et Cosmochimica Acta
 Geostandards and Geoanalytical Research
 Geostandards Newsletter
 Organic Geochemistry
 Quaternary Geochronology

Geology

Mineralogy and petrology 
 American Mineralogist
 Contributions to Mineralogy and Petrology
 European Journal of Mineralogy
 Journal of Petrology
 Mineralium Deposita
 Reviews in Mineralogy and Geochemistry

Geophysics

Hydrology 
 Journal of Hydrology
 Water Research
 Water Resources Research

Oceanography 
 Annual Review of Marine Science
 Deep Sea Research
 Journal of Geophysical Research: section C (Oceans)
 Journal of Marine Research
 Journal of Physical Oceanography
 Ocean Science
 Paleoceanography

Unsorted
 Episodes
 Journal of Glaciology
 Australian Meteorological Magazine

See also 
 List of scientific journals

External links 
 List of geoscience journals and rankings at eigenfactor.org

 
Geophysics lists
Lists of environmental publications
Lists of academic journals